Fred Youngblood McDaniel (January 21, 1913 – January 8, 1990), sometimes listed as "McDaniels", was an American Negro league outfielder in the 1940s.

A native of Henderson, Texas, McDaniel made his Negro leagues debut in 1942 with the Memphis Red Sox. He went on to play four more seasons with Memphis through 1946. McDaniel died in Garland, Texas in 1990 at age 76.

References

External links
 and Seamheads

1913 births
1990 deaths
Memphis Red Sox players
Baseball outfielders
Baseball players from Texas
People from Henderson, Texas
20th-century African-American sportspeople